Theodore Constantine, Baron Constantine of Stanmore  (15 March 1910 – 13 February 2004) was a British businessman and Conservative political activist who served as both the Chairman and the President of the National Union of Conservative and Unionist Associations.

Born to a tobacco importer of Greek origin, Constantine was educated at Acton College. During World War II, he served with the Royal Auxiliary Air Force as a plotter at Fighter Command's headquarters at Bentley Priory; he was awarded the Air Efficiency Award in 1945. After he was demobilized, he founded a hearing aid company that counted Sir Winston Churchill among its clients.

In 1965, Constantine was involved in a public controversy as Chairman of the Harrow East Conservative Association. The sitting Conservative MP, Anthony Courtney, had been entrapped in Moscow by the KGB in a honeypot operation. Constantine urged Courtney to step down, but the latter refused; when Courtney was re-adopted as the Conservative candidate, Constantine resigned from the constituency party's executive. Courtney subsequently lost the seat in the 1966 general election, as Constantine had predicted. Courtney later successfully sued Constantine for slander, and was awarded £200 in damages.

He served as the Chairmen of National Union of Conservative and Unionist Associations during 1967-8 and its President from 1980–1.

Constantine was appointed CBE in 1956, knighted in 1964, and made a Deputy Lieutenant for Greater London in 1967. He served as High Sheriff of Greater London in 1967. He was made a life peer on 21 July 1981, as Baron Constantine of Stanmore, of Stanmore in Greater London.

References

External links 

 

1910 births
2004 deaths
British people of Greek descent
Commanders of the Order of the British Empire
Conservative Party (UK) life peers
Deputy Lieutenants of Greater London
Knights Bachelor
Conservative Party (UK) officials
20th-century British businesspeople
Royal Air Force personnel of World War II
High Sheriffs of Greater London
Life peers created by Elizabeth II